The 1950 San Jose State Spartans football team represented San Jose State College during the 1950 college football season.

San Jose State competed in the California Collegiate Athletic Association through the 1949 season. In 1950, the team moved to the University Division and played as an Independent. The team was led by first-year head coach Bob Bronzan, and played home games at Spartan Stadium in San Jose, California. They finished the season with a record of six wins, three losses and one tie (6–3–1). Overall, the team outscored its opponents 201–118 for the season.

Schedule

Team players in the NFL
The following San Jose State players were selected in the 1951 NFL Draft.

Notes

References

San Jose State
San Jose State Spartans football seasons
San Jose State Spartans football